1995 Academy Awards may refer to:

 67th Academy Awards, the Academy Awards ceremony that took place in 1995
 68th Academy Awards, the 1996 ceremony honoring the best in film for 1995